The Sabil-Kuttab of Sultan Qaytbay is a Mamluk-era charitable foundation and building in Cairo, Egypt. It was built in 1479 on the order of Sultan al-Ashraf Qaytbay and is located on Saliba Street in the historic districts of Cairo.

The building is composed of a sabil (a water distribution kiosk) on the ground floor and a kuttab (primary school teaching the Qur'an) on the upper floors. Below the structure, underground, is a cistern from which water was drawn for the sabil. The structure was the first free-standing sabil-kuttab in Cairo; a type of building that would later become quite common during the Ottoman period.

Gallery

See also 

Sabil of Qaytbay (at the Temple Mount in Jerusalem)
Wikala and Sabil-Kuttab of Qaytbay (at al-Azhar)
Funerary complex of Sultan Qaytbay (at the Northern Cemetery)
 Mamluk architecture

References 

Qaitbay
Mamluk architecture in Egypt
Medieval Cairo